Without Consent, also known as Trapped and Deceived, is a 1994 television film directed by Robert Iscove and starring Jennie Garth, Jill Eikenberry, and Tom Irwin. The film, which was based on a true story, was received generally negatively, although the lead actors were praised for their roles.

Plot 
Laura Mills is a rebellious teenager who spends her days getting drunk, listening to rock music and making out with several boyfriends. Her behavior gets worse when her brother David is kicked out of the house for theft and alcohol abuse. When it turns out she was involved in a drunk driving accident, her parents decide they have had enough. They are not able to control their daughter and send her to a Residential treatment center. It soon turns out that patients in this center are drugged and abused by the staff.

Laura feels that she does not belong in the facility, claiming that she has no mental problems. Attempts to escape from the center prove unsuccessful and she is shot with a tranquilizer, and, one night, was placed in a straitjacket. One day, she succeeds in escaping and immediately turns to her parents. They, however, do not believe a word she is saying about the facility and send her back. The staff, angered by her escape, make clear that they will not treat her properly any longer. It becomes clear to Laura that she has no hope of ever leading a normal life again and accepts her fate.

When Laura's health gets worse, her parents start to believe that she was telling the truth. They decide that she should return home again, but the doctors are not willing to let her go. Determined to end the practice of the doctors, with the help from lawyer Nora Fields, Laura's parents take the issue to court, where the facility is put on trial.

Cast
Jennie Garth as Laura Mills
Jill Eikenberry as Michelle Mills
Tom Irwin as Robert Mills
Johnny Galecki as Marty
Eric Close as David Mills
Helen Shaver as Nora Fields
Paul Sorvino as Dr. Winslow
Cynthia Dorn as Miss Collins

References

External links

1994 television films
1994 films
American films based on actual events
1990s English-language films
Films directed by Robert Iscove
Films scored by Craig Safan
ABC Motion Pictures films
Behavior modification
American television films